Antonio-Mirko Čolak (born 17 September 1993) is a professional footballer who plays as a forward for Scottish Premiership club Rangers. Born in Germany, he represents the Croatia national team.

Čolak began his senior career in the lower divisions of German football and has since gone on to play in the top flights of German, Polish, Croatian, Greek, Swedish and Scottish football. He was the top scorer in the 2019–20 Prva HNL season while playing for Croatian club HNK Rijeka. He won the 2021 Allsvenskan title while on loan at Swedish club Malmö from Greek club PAOK.

Čolak played more than 20 times for Croatia's youth national teams, before making his senior international debut for the country in November 2020 in a friendly against Turkey.

Club career

Early career
The Čolak family immigrated to Germany in 1992 to avoid the war in the former Yugoslavia, where Antonio was born on 17 September 1993. Born in Ludwigsburg, in 2000 he signed for Stuttgarter Kickers, where he remained for eight years before returning to Freiburg in 2008. From there he joined the youth academy at Hoffenheim in 2010 for just one year, and in 2011 moved to Karlsruhe, where he made his professional debut in the lower leagues. In 2012 he was signed by 1. FC Nürnberg, initially for the reserve team. Čolak made his debut on 19 October 2013 in a Bundesliga game against Eintracht Frankfurt. He entered the field after 78 minutes for Tomáš Pekhart. He stayed in Nuremberg until 2015, playing in seven games, while for one season he was loaned out to Lechia Gdańsk, where he scored ten goals in 31 games, also contributing two assists.

Hoffenheim and loan spells
In the summer of 2015 he signed a contract with TSG 1899 Hoffenheim, but he did not play with the club throughout his contract. Initially he joined 1. FC Kaiserslautern on a season-long loan. On 25 July 2016, Čolak joined Darmstadt 98 on a season-long loan. For the following season he was again sent out on loan, to 2. Bundesliga side FC Ingolstadt.

Rijeka
Following the mutually agreed termination of the loan at Ingolstadt, in January 2018, Čolak was loaned to HNK Rijeka in Croatia until June 2019. Following the end of the loan, on 22 June 2019 Čolak officially joined HNK Rijeka on a three-year contract. In the 2019–20 season, he was the top scorer in the Croatian championship with 20 goals, while with Rijeka he also won two Croatian Cups. His performances also saw him win a place in the Croatia national football team.

PAOK and loan to Malmö
On 20 September 2020, PAOK agreed terms with Rijeka for the purchase of Čolak. The Greek club paid a fee over €3,000,000, while Čolak signed a four-year contract worth €450,000 per year.

On 6 March 2021, Čolak moved to Swedish side Malmö FF, on a loan deal until December 2021. At Malmö FF, Čolak quickly established himself as a prolific goalscorer with ten goals in his first 15 appearances and went on to win the title with Malmö. In December 2021, with Malmö FF unwilling to pay the buy out of €3 million that had been set in his loan contract, Croatian newspaper "Sportske Novosti" linked Čolak with a move to Dinamo Zagreb. He returned to PAOK from the beginning of January 2022.

On 20 March 2022, he scored a goal after an Alexandru Mitriță assist, helping PAOK to gain a 1–0 away win against rivals AEK Athens for the Play-off round. It was his first goal for the club after his return from Malmö FF.

Rangers
On 7 July 2022, Čolak joined his eleventh club Rangers, signing a three-year deal with the Scottish Premiership team. He made his debut for the club against Scottish Premiership side Livingston, starting the match on 30 July. Čolak scored his first goal for Rangers in Scottish Premiership match against Kilmarnock on 6 August then followed this by netting in the next two consecutive matches verse Union Saint-Gilloise and St Johnstone.

On 24 August, Čolak scored the winning goal in the Champions League play-off second leg against PSV Eindhoven to send Rangers to the group stage for the first time since 2010.

International career
Čolak played youth international football for Croatia at under-18, under-19 and under-20 levels. On 27 August 2020 Croatia national team head coach Zlatko Dalić included Čolak in the list of players for the Nations League fixtures against Portugal on 5 September 2020 and France on 8 September 2020.

On 31 October 2022, Čolak was named in Croatia's preliminary 34-man squad for the 2022 FIFA World Cup, but did not make the final 26.

Career statistics

Club

International

Honours

Rijeka
 Croatian Cup: 2018–19, 2019–20

Malmö FF
 Allsvenskan: 2021

PAOK
Greek Cup runner-up: 2021–22

Individual
 Croatian First Football League Top goalscorer: 2019–20 (20 goals)
Croatian Cup Top goalscorer: 2018–19

References

External links

1993 births
Living people
People from Ludwigsburg
Sportspeople from Stuttgart (region)
Footballers from Baden-Württemberg
German people of Croatian descent
Association football forwards
German footballers
Croatian footballers
Croatia youth international footballers
Croatia international footballers
Karlsruher SC II players
1. FC Nürnberg II players
1. FC Nürnberg players
Lechia Gdańsk players
1. FC Kaiserslautern players
1. FC Kaiserslautern II players
SV Darmstadt 98 players
FC Ingolstadt 04 players
FC Ingolstadt 04 II players
HNK Rijeka players
PAOK FC players
Malmö FF players
Rangers F.C. players
Regionalliga players
Bundesliga players
2. Bundesliga players
Ekstraklasa players
Croatian Football League players
Super League Greece players
Allsvenskan players
Scottish Professional Football League players
Croatian expatriate footballers
Expatriate footballers in Poland
Croatian expatriate sportspeople in Poland
Expatriate footballers in Greece
Croatian expatriate sportspeople in Greece
Expatriate footballers in Sweden
Croatian expatriate sportspeople in Sweden